{{Speciesbox
| image = Markhamia lutea blossoms closeup.jpg
| image_caption = Blossoms of Markhamia lutea
| status = LC
| status_system = IUCN3.1
| status_ref = 
| genus = Markhamia 
| species = lutea
| authority = (Benth.) K.Schum.
| synonyms_ref = 
| synonyms = 
Dolichandrone lutea Benth. ex Hook.
Dolichandrone platycalyx  (Baker) Sprague.
Markhamia hildebrantii  Sprague
Markhamia platycalyx  SpragueSpathodea lutea Benth.
}}Markhamia lutea'', the Nile tulip, Nile trumpet or siala tree is a tree species of the family Bignoniaceae, native to eastern Africa and cultivated for its large bright yellow flowers. It is related to the African tulip tree.
Native to Africa, Markhamia was named in the honour of Clements Markham (1830-1916), who worked in India. An evergreen small tree that grows to 4–5 m in height outside of native zones, although it can reach more than 10 m in its zones of origin. Leaves, of 20–30 cm in length, normally arranged in groups in the ends of the branches. Flowers in terminal clusters. They are trumpet shaped, yellow in colour, with orange-reddish spots in the throat. They measure 5–6 cm in length. Fruit is a capsule, of up to 70 cm in length, with abundant winged seeds. It is propagated by seeds.

Notes

References

External links
World Agroforestry Centre Species Information
 

Flora of Africa
Flora of Uganda
lutea